A Tsirelson bound is an upper limit to quantum mechanical correlations between distant events. Given that quantum mechanics violates Bell inequalities (i.e., it cannot be described by a local hidden-variable theory), a natural question to ask is how large can the violation be. The answer is precisely the Tsirelson bound for the particular Bell inequality in question. In general, this bound is lower than the bound that would be obtained if more general theories, only constrained by "no-signalling" (i.e., that they do not permit communication faster than light), were considered, and much research has been dedicated to the question of why this is the case.

The Tsirelson bounds are named after Boris S. Tsirelson (or Cirel'son, in a different transliteration), the author of the article in which the first one was derived.

Bound for the CHSH inequality

The first Tsirelson bound was derived as an upper bound on the correlations measured in the CHSH inequality.

 

The Tsirelson bound is attained already if Alice and Bob each makes measurements on a qubit, the simplest non-trivial quantum system.

Several proofs of this bound exist, but perhaps the most enlightening one is based on the Khalfin–Tsirelson–Landau identity. If we define an observable

 

 

In the quantum case, we need only notice that , and the Tsirelson bound  follows.

Other Bell inequalities 

Tsirelson also showed that for any bipartite full-correlation Bell inequality with m inputs for Alice and n inputs for Bob, the ratio between the Tsirelson bound and the local bound is at most

where

Note that since , this bound implies the above result about the CHSH inequality.

In general, obtaining a Tsirelson bound for a given Bell inequality is a hard problem that has to be solved on a case-by-case basis. It is not even known to be decidable. The best known computational method for upperbounding it is a convergent hierarchy of semidefinite programs, the NPA hierarchy, that in general does not halt. The exact values are known for a few more Bell inequalities:

For the Braunstein–Caves inequalities we have that

 

For the WWŻB inequalities the Tsirelson bound is

 

It is conjectured that only infinite-dimensional quantum states can reach the Tsirelson bound.

Derivation from physical principles 

Significant research has been dedicated to finding a physical principle that explains why quantum correlations go only up to the Tsirelson bound and nothing more. Three such principles have been found: no-advantage for non-local computation, information causality and macroscopic locality. That is to say, if one could achieve a CHSH correlation exceeding Tsirelson's bound, all such principles would be violated.
Tsirelson's bound also follows if the Bell experiment admits a strongly positive quansal measure.

Tsirelson's problem

There are two different ways of defining the Tsirelson bound of a Bell expression. One by demanding that the measurements are in a tensor product structure, and another by demanding only that they commute. Tsirelson's problem is the question of whether these two definitions are equivalent. More formally, let
 
be a Bell expression, where  is the probability of obtaining outcomes  with the settings .
 
The commuting Tsirelson bound is the supremum of the value attained in this Bell expression by making measurements  and  such that  on a quantum state :
 
Since tensor product algebras in particular commute, . In finite dimensions commuting algebras are always isomorphic to (direct sums of) tensor product algebras, so only for infinite dimensions it is possible that . Tsirelson's problem is the question of whether for all Bell expressions .

This question was first considered by Boris Tsirelson in 1993, where he asserted without proof that . Upon being asked for a proof by Antonio Acín in 2006, he realized that the one he had in mind didn't work, and issued the question as an open problem. Together with Miguel Navascués and Stefano Pironio, Antonio Acín had developed an hierarchy of semidefinite programs, the NPA hierarchy, that converged to the commuting Tsirelson bound  from above, and wanted to know whether it also converged to the tensor product Tsirelson bound , the most physically relevant one.

Conversely, if  is not computable, then . In January 2020, Ji, Natarajan, Vidick, Wright, and Yuen claimed to have proven that  is not computable, thus solving Tsirelson's problem in the negative; a finalized, but still unreviewed, version of the proof appeared in Communications of the ACM in November 2021. Tsirelson's problem has been shown to be equivalent to Connes' embedding problem, so the same proof also implies that the Connes embedding problem is false.

See also
 Quantum nonlocality
 Bell's theorem
 EPR paradox
 CHSH inequality
 Quantum pseudo-telepathy

References 

Quantum measurement